Sebastian Brehm (born 18 October 1971) is a German tax advisor and politician of the Christian Social Union (CSU) who has been serving as a member of the Bundestag from the state of Bavaria since 2017.

Political career 
In 1989 Brehm joined the CSU. 

Brehm became a member of the Bundestag in the 2017 German federal election. He is a member of the Finance Committee and the Committee on Human Rights and Humanitarian Aid. In that capacity, he is his parliamentary group's rapporteur on human rights issues in Russia, Ukraine, Belarus, Moldova, Romania and Bulgaria, among others.

Within his parliamentary group, Brehm coordinates the CSU parliamentarians’ legislative activities on financial policy.  

In 2019, German tabloid BILD reported that Brehm was the parliamentarian who reported the highest income from activities unrelated to his mandate that year.

Since 2021, Brehm has been serving as one of two treasurers of the CSU, under the leadership of chairman Markus Söder.

Other activities

Government agencies
 Federal Agency for Civic Education (BPB), Member of the Board of Trustees (2018–2021)

Non-profit organizations
 German Red Cross (DRK), Member (since 2005)
 Rotary International, Member (since 2003)

Political positions 
In September 2020, Brehm was one of 15 members of his parliamentary group who joined Norbert Röttgen in writing an open letter to Minister of the Interior Horst Seehofer which called on Germany and other EU counties to take in 5000 immigrants who were left without shelter after fires gutted the overcrowded Mória Reception and Identification Centre on the Greek island of Lesbos.

References

External links 

  
 Bundestag biography 

1971 births
Living people
Members of the Bundestag for Bavaria
Members of the Bundestag 2017–2021
Members of the Bundestag 2021–2025
Politicians from Nuremberg
Members of the Bundestag for the Christian Social Union in Bavaria